"One Big Country Song" is a song recorded by American country music duo LoCash. It is the second single from their third studio album Brothers. Jesse Frasure, Ashley Gorley and Hardy wrote the song.

Content
Tyler Hubbard of Florida Georgia Line co-produced it with Corey Crowder.

Chris Parton of the blog Sounds Like Nashville said that the song is about "focusing on the things we share in common – from the drive to succeed to the need to unwind every weekend." Billy Dukes of Taste of Country said of the song that "Chris Lucas and Preston Brust find unity in our shared experiences over a strikingly simple guitar riff."

Music video
TK McKamy directed the song's corresponding video, which features disembodied boots and hats in various scenes.

Chart performance

Weekly charts

Year-end charts

Certifications

References

2019 songs
2019 singles
BBR Music Group singles
LoCash songs
Songs written by Ashley Gorley
Songs written by Jesse Frasure
Songs written by Hardy (singer)
Music videos directed by TK McKamy